Vladlen is a masculine given name of Soviet origin. Notable people with the name include:

 Vladlen Babayev (b. 1996), Russian footballer
 Vladlen Davydov (1924–2012), Russian actor
 Vladlen Naumenko (b. 1947), Ukrainian footballer
 Vladlen Pavlenkov (1929–1990), Russian dissident
 Vladlen Trostyansky (1935–2014), Ukrainian wrestler
 Vladlen Yurchenko (b. 1994), Ukrainian footballer
 Vladlen Zurakhov (1930–1991), Ukrainian chess player

Masculine given names